Newman Catholic High School may refer to:

 Newman Catholic High School (Mason City, Iowa)
 Newman Catholic High School (Wausau, Wisconsin)

See also 
 Cardinal Newman (disambiguation)
 Cardinal Newman High School, Bellshill